Shehata is an Arabic surname. Notable people with the surname include:

Hamza Shehata (c.1910-c.1971), Saudi philosopher, poet and civic leader 
Hassan Shehata (born 1949), Egyptian football coach and former player
Hasan Shahhata (1946-2013), Egyptian ex-Sunni cleric and scholar, who later converted to Shia Islam. He was killed in Giza by a mob
Mohamed Raafat Shehata, Egyptian Major-General and head of Egyptian General Intelligence Directorate 2012-2013
Nehad Shehata (born 1975), Egyptian volleyball player
Reda Shehata (born 1981), Egyptian football player 
Riad Shehata, Egyptian photographer
Thirwat Shehata (also Tarwat Salah Abdallah) (born 1960), alleged core member of Egyptian Islamic Jihad

See also
Shehata's Shop, in Arabic Dokkan Shehata, 2009 Egyptian drama film